The 2022 Primera B de Chile, also known as Campeonato Ascenso Betsson 2022 for sponsorship purposes, was the 68th season of the Primera B de Chile, Chile's second-tier football league. The fixture for the season was announced on 1 February 2022, with the competition starting on 15 February and ending on 27 November 2022.

Magallanes were the champions, clinching their first Primera B title as well as promotion to Primera División on the final day of the regular season with a 2–0 win over Deportes Recoleta on 1 November 2022. The other promoted club was Deportes Copiapó, who won the promotion play-off after beating the regular season runners-up Cobreloa in the finals.

Format
The tournament was played by 17 teams, 14 returning from the previous season, two relegated from the 2021 Campeonato Nacional (Deportes Melipilla and Santiago Wanderers), and the 2021 Segunda División Profesional champions Deportes Recoleta. The 17 teams played each other in a double round-robin tournament (once at home and once away) for a total of 32 matches, with every team having two bye rounds. The top team at the end of the 34 rounds was the champion and was promoted to the Campeonato Nacional for its 2023 season, while the next five teams played a play-off tournament (Liguilla) in which the league runners-up received a bye to the final. The playoffs winning team was the second and last promoted team to the top flight for the following season. Two teams were relegated to the Segunda División Profesional at the end of the season: the bottom-placed team in the league standings as well as the bottom-placed team in the relegation table, which considered the performance of teams in the 2021 and 2022 seasons.

Teams

Stadia and locations

Notes

Standings

Results

Promotion playoff

Bracket

Quarter-finals

Deportes Puerto Montt won 3–1 on aggregate and advanced to the semi-final.

Deportes Copiapó won 5–1 on aggregate and advanced to the semi-final.

Semi-final

Deportes Copiapó won 4–3 on aggregate and advanced to the final.

Final

Deportes Copiapó won 5–0 on aggregate and were promoted to Primera División.

Top scorers

Source: Soccerway

Relegation
For this season, a relegation table was elaborated by computing an average of the points earned per game over this season and the previous one. Promoted team Deportes Recoleta and the relegated ones Deportes Melipilla and Santiago Wanderers only had their points in the 2022 season averaged. The team placing last in this table at the end of the season was relegated. In case this team was also the last-placed one in the season's table, the team placed second-to-last in this table would also be relegated.

Source: ANFP

See also
2022 Chilean Primera División
2022 Copa Chile
2022 Supercopa de Chile

References

External links
Primera B on ANFP's website

Primera B de Chile seasons
Primera B
Chile